Carlos Fernando Borja Bolívar (born December 25, 1956 in Cochabamba) is a retired Bolivian football midfielder.

Club career
At club level Borja was a one club man playing his entire club career for Bolívar, where he won eleven Bolivian league titles. He played in more than 530 games, and scored 129 league goals for Bolívar making him the 3rd highest goalscorer in the history of the club. He also played in 87 Copa Libertadores games scoring 11 goals for La Academia. He is remembered as one of the most important players in the history of the club.

International career
He was capped 88 times and scored one international goal for the Bolivia national team between 1979 and 1995, including three matches at the 1994 FIFA World Cup. He scored his only goal for Bolivia in a friendly match on June 23, 1987 in Montevideo against Uruguay (2-1 loss).

Later life
He has become a well-known politician and has served in the management of sports for Bolivia, following his retirement. His time of politics included a house of representatives position at one point in time.

Honours
Bolivian League Championship: 11
 1978, 1982, 1983, 1985, 1987, 1988, 1991, 1992, 1994, 1996, 1997 (Bolívar )

References

External links

 Copa Libertadores
One-club man

1956 births
Living people
Sportspeople from Cochabamba
Bolivian footballers
Club Bolívar players
Association football midfielders
Bolivia international footballers
1994 FIFA World Cup players
1979 Copa América players
1983 Copa América players
1987 Copa América players
1989 Copa América players
1991 Copa América players
1993 Copa América players
1995 Copa América players